Luverne is a city in and the county seat of Crenshaw County, Alabama, United States. The city describes itself as "The Friendliest City in the South", a slogan that appears on its "welcome" signs. At the 2020 census, the population was 2,765.

History
Luverne was one of numerous towns developed in the state as a result of railroad construction.

On July 2, 1880, the Montgomery and Southern Railway was created to construct a new railroad linking Montgomery to the Florida coast. The company was reorganized as the Montgomery and Florida Railway in May 1886, and a second time as the Northwest and Florida Railroad in 1888. In November 1888, the railroad reached the site of Luverne in the central part of Crenshaw County, near the Patsaliga River. Now totaling  the line was converted to standard gauge by July 1889 and it was decided to proceed no further. The Alabama Terminal and Improvement Company, a subsidiary of the Alabama Midland Railway, controlled the railroad by 1889 and the line from Montgomery to Luverne was into the network of the latter.

The new railroad terminus attracted related development, and the town grew. It was incorporated in 1891, and became a center of timbering in the Piney Woods of southern Alabama, as the land was not fertile enough to be suitable for large-scale cotton plantation agriculture.

In 1893, the citizens of Crenshaw County voted to move the county seat from Rutledge to the more populous Luverne.

By the late 1930s, lynchings of African Americans were increasingly conducted in small groups or in secret, rather than in the former mass public displays. On June 22, 1940, an African-American man named Jesse Thornton was lynched in Luverne for failing to address a white man with the title of "Mister". He was fatally shot and his body was later found in the Patsaliga River. The Equal Justice Initiative documented that the white man Thornton had apparently offended by his Jim Crow infraction was a police officer. This was the only lynching recorded in the county.

Geography
The town of Rutledge lies along Luverne's western border.

Climate
According to the Köppen climate classification, Luverne has a humid subtropical climate (abbreviated Cfa).

Demographics

2000 census
As of the census of 2000, there were 2,635 people, 1,107 households, and 710 families living in the city. The racial makeup of the city was 70.25% White, 28.43% Black or African American, 0.08% Native American, 0.15% Asian, 0.04% Pacific Islander, 0.11% from other races, and 0.95% from two or more races. 0.68% of the population were Hispanic or Latino of any race.

Of the 1,107 households 28.9% had children under the age of 18 living with them, 42.7% were married couples living together (2.4% same-sex couples), 19.5% had a female householder with no husband present, and 35.8% were non-families. 33.8% of households were one person and 19.2% were one person aged 65 or older. The average household size was 2.24 and the average family size was 2.85.

The age distribution was 23.0% under the age of 18, 6.8% from 18 to 24, 23.4% from 25 to 44, 23.3% from 45 to 64, and 23.4% 65 or older. The median age was 42 years. For every 100 females, there were 77.0 males. For every 100 females age 18 and over, there were 71.1 males.

The median household income was $22,457 and the median family income  was $30,950. Males had a median income of $30,680 versus $17,813 for females. The per capita income for the city was $17,244. About 19.2% of families and 22.7% of the population were below the poverty line, including 31.3% of those under age 18 and 18.9% of those age 65 or over.

2010 census
As of the census of 2010, there were 2,800 people, 1,135 households, and 729 families living in the city. The racial makeup of the city was 62.6% White, 29.6% Black or African American, 0.3% Native American, 5.5% Asian, 0.3% Pacific Islander, 0.8% from other races, and 1.0% from two or more races. 1.9% of the population were Hispanic or Latino of any race.

Of the 1,135 households 26.9% had children under the age of 18 living with them, 41.7% were married couples living together (2.4% same-sex couples), 19.2% had a female householder with no husband present, and 35.8% were non-families. 32.8% of households were one person and 14.8% were one person aged 65 or older. The average household size was 2.35 and the average family size was 2.95.

The age distribution was 23.8% under the age of 18, 7.9% from 18 to 24, 22.4% from 25 to 44, 26.3% from 45 to 64, and 19.7% 65 or older. The median age was 41.2 years. For every 100 females, there were 84.6 males. For every 100 females age 18 and over, there were 85.3 males.

The median household income was $40,602 and the median family income  was $51,500. Males had a median income of $43,464 versus $19,483 for females. The per capita income for the city was $18,869. About 12.6% of families and 15.8% of the population were below the poverty line, including 11.8% of those under age 18 and 20.6% of those age 65 or over.

2020 census

As of the 2020 United States census, there were 2,765 people, 1,005 households, and 634 families residing in the city.

Education
 Primary and secondary education
Public education for the city of Luverne is provided by the Crenshaw County School District. There are two schools in the city: Luverne High School (grades K through 12) and Crenshaw Christian Academy, a private, religiously oriented K-12 school.
 Post-secondary education
Lurleen B. Wallace Community College offers certificate and two-year associate degrees at its Luverne location.

Media
 Radio station
 WHLW 104.3 FM (Gospel)
 WSMX-FM 100.3 FM   (Country/Gospel)
 Newspaper
 Luverne Journal (weekly)
 Television
 Hunt Channel TV

Notable people
 Chester Adams, former American football guard
 Dorothy Bendross-Mindingall, former member of the Florida House of Representatives
 Wendell Mitchell, Served as a Democratic member of the Alabama Senate, representing the 30th District from 1974 to 2010
 Donta Hall, NBA basketball player for the Brooklyn Nets

Gallery

References

External links
 City of Luverne official website
 Luverne Journal

Cities in Alabama
Cities in Crenshaw County, Alabama
County seats in Alabama
Populated places established in 1889
1889 establishments in Alabama